Şehzade Cihangir (9 December 1531 – 27 November 1553) was an Ottoman prince, the sixth and youngest child of Sultan Suleiman the Magnificent and his wife Hurrem Sultan.

Life
Cihangir was born on 9 December 1531 in Constantinople  during the reign of his father, Suleiman the Magnificent. His mother was Hurrem Sultan, an Orthodox priest's daughter, who was the current Sultan's concubine at the time. In 1533 or 1534, his mother, Hurrem, was freed and became Suleiman's legal wife. He had four elder brothers, Şehzade Mehmed, Şehzade Abdullah, who died at the age of three years, Şehzade Selim (future Selim II), and Şehzade Bayezid, and an elder sister Mihrimah Sultan. He was educated together with his older brothers under supervision of his
time. He wrote poems with the pen name Zarifi, and was also interested in calligraphy.

In 1539, Cihangir and his elder brother Bayezid were circumcised, and their sister Mihrimah was married to Rüstem Pasha. The collective festivities lasted fifteen days. In March 1547 Cihangir and his mother travelled to Manisa, visiting his elder Selim, who had been transferred there after Mehmed's death in 1543, and spent a month there. In 1548, he accompanied his father to the second Iran expedition.

Cihangir had health problems, and was a hunchback. He did not receive a provincial governorate because his infirmity was seen as a disqualification for rulership and perhaps also because of his need for medical treatment. In one of her letters to the sultan while he was on military campaign, his mother wrote of the success of an operation performed on the child's shoulder. As the youngest child in the family and as a result of his disability, Cihangir was loved and treated exclusively.

Cihangir was his father's constant companion. His father had acknowledged the probability of his elder half-brother Şehzade Mustafa's success. However, Cihangir ventured that his physical deformity would allow him to escape the princely fate of fratricide, to which his father responded, "My son, Mustafa will become the sultan and will deprive you all of your lives."

Death
In the third Iran expedition, Cihangir together with his father departed from Istanbul and reached the plains of Ereğli. Şehzade Mustafa, also arrived with his troops from Konya, where he was strangled by their father's guards on 6 October 1553. Since Cihangir died in Aleppo not long after this incident on 27 November 1553. it became a popularized theory that he had died as a result of shock and grief caused by his half-brother's execution. One source even tried to claim that he committed suicide on hearing the news. However, this has largely been dismissed as inaccurate due to the lack of supporting evidence of any closeness between the two brothers. Rather it is now understood that Cihangir's passing came as a direct result of the chronic health problems he was documented as having throughout his life.

After his death, his body was taken to Istanbul where he was buried alongside his older brother Şehzade Mehmed in the Şehzade Mosque. The Istanbul neighborhood of Cihangir was named after Şehzade Cihangir when his father had Mimar Sinan build a wooden mosque there in 1559 to commemorate his death. The area, which overlooks the Bosphorous, was one of Cihangir's favorite places. The neighborhood's name comes from this mosque.

In popular culture
 In the television series Muhteşem Yüzyıl, Cihangir is played by Turkish actor Tolga Sarıtaş.

References

Sources
 

 

1531 births
1553 deaths
Turkish poets
16th-century Ottoman royalty
Ottoman princes
Royalty from Istanbul
Turks from the Ottoman Empire
Suleiman the Magnificent
Royalty and nobility with disabilities